Notable people with the name Mustard include:

 Chad Mustard (born 1977), American football tight end
 Deanna Mustard (born 1980), American voice actress
 DJ Mustard (born Dijon McFarlane in 1990), American music producer and DJ
 Ernest Mustard (1893–1971), World War I flying ace
 Fred Mustard Stewart (1932–2007), American novelist
 Jack Mustard, English professional association footballer
 James Fraser Mustard (1927–2011), Canadian physician and scientist
 John F. Mustard, American planetary scientist
 Phil Mustard (born 1982), English cricketer
 William Thornton Mustard (1914–1987), Canadian physician and cardiac surgeon